Prinstein is a surname. Notable people with the surname include:

Justin Prinstein (born 1984), American baseball player
Mitch Prinstein, American author and psychologist
Myer Prinstein (1878–1925), Polish-American track and field athlete